John Kirwan may refer to:
 John Kirwan (cricketer) (1816–1899), English cricketer
 John Kirwan (politician) (1869–1949), Australian politician
 Sir John Kirwan (rugby) (born 1964), New Zealand dual-code rugby footballer and coach
 Jack Kirwan (John Henry Kirwan) (1878–1959), Irish international footballer player who played for Everton, Tottenham and Chelsea
 Jack Kirwan (rugby league) (1896–1968), New Zealand rugby league player
 Sir John Kirwan (1650–1721), Irish entrepreneur
 John William Kirwan (died 1849), president of Queen's College, Galway
 John Óge Kirwan (fl. 1530–1531), mayor of Galway